Redžep Selman (born April 8, 1986 in Ohrid) is a Macedonian triple jumper. Selman represented Macedonia at the 2008 Summer Olympics in Beijing, where he competed in the men's triple jump. He finished only in thirty-seventh place for the qualifying rounds, with a best jump of 15.29 metres on his second attempt.

References

External links
 
 NBC 2008 Olympics profile

1986 births
Living people
Macedonian triple jumpers
Male triple jumpers
Olympic athletes of North Macedonia
Athletes (track and field) at the 2008 Summer Olympics
Sportspeople from Ohrid
Macedonian people of Turkish descent
Macedonian male athletes